Down Our Alley is a 1939 British musical film directed by George A. Cooper and starring Hughie Green, Wally Patch and Vivienne Chatterton. It was made at Highbury Studios as a quota quickie.

Main cast
 Hughie Green as Hughie Dunstable  
 Wally Patch as Mr. Dunstable  
 Vivienne Chatterton as Mrs. Dunstable  
 Sylvia Saetre as Sally  
 Anthony Holles as Tony 
 Daphne Raglan as Mary  
 Philip Morant as Eustace 
 Johnnie Schofield as Waiter

References

Bibliography
 Chibnall, Steve. Quota Quickies: The Birth of the British 'B' Film. British Film Institute, 2007.
 Low, Rachael. Filmmaking in 1930s Britain. George Allen & Unwin, 1985.
 Wood, Linda. British Films, 1927-1939. British Film Institute, 1986.

External links

1939 films
British musical films
1939 musical films
Films directed by George A. Cooper
Quota quickies
Films set in England
Films shot at Highbury Studios
British black-and-white films
1930s English-language films
1930s British films